Gashmeer Mahajani (born 8 June 1985) is an Indian film, theatre and television actor. He is better known for his work in Marathi cinema. He is the son of veteran Marathi film actor Ravindra Mahajani.

Gashmeer made his silver screen debut with P. Som Shekar's Hindi film Muskurake Dekh Zara (2010), although only in 2015 did he achieve popularity, when Carry On Maratha, which was his Marathi film debut and Deool Band were released.

Personal life 

He is the son of renowned and veteran Marathi actor Ravindra Mahajani. He married Gauri Deshmukh on 28 December 2014. On 21 December 2019, the couple had their first child, a boy, Vyom.

Media image

Career
In 2010, Mahajani made his screen debut with a Bollywood film named Muskurake Dekh Zara as Vivek. This film was commercially unsuccessful. Gashmeer next joined Mumbai's Prithvi Theatre, wherein he enacted various roles and directed.

In 2015, Gashmeer debuted in the Regional Marathi Film Industry with his popular Marathi debut film Carry On Maratha as Maartand opposite actress Kashmira Kulkarni. In the same year, he also starred in another Marathi film Deoold Band, where he portrayed the role of Dr. Raghav Shastri. This film saw some success globally.

In 2016, he played Raghu in Kanha and Aditya Rane in One Way Ticket. He also starred in another Bollywood film Dongri Ka Raja as Raja.

In 2017, he was seen as Ajay in Mala Kahich Problem Nahi.

In 2018, he did a crime horror show named Anjaan: Special Crimes Unit, an Indian paranormal investigative series, which aired on Discovery Jeet.

In 2019, he played Sardar Jankoji Shinde in historical Panipat.

In 2020, he portrayed Aditya Deodhar in Bonus. Later he made his web debut with SonyLIV's Shrikant Bashir, an action drama series. From 2020 to 2022, Mahajani was seen in Imlie as Aditya Kumar Tripathi, opposite Sumbul Touqueer Khan and Mayuri Deshmukh.

In 2022, he was seen in and as Vishu alongside Mrinmayee Godbole. Next, he was seen in Sarsenapati Hambirrao where he portrayed double roles, Chhatrapati Shivaji Maharaj and Chhatrapati Sambhaji Maharaj.

In 2022, he was seen as a contestant in a dance-based reality show Jhalak Dikhhla Jaa 10, where he finished at 4th place. Currently, he is seen as a judge in Zee Marathi's Dance Maharashtra Dance L'il Masters.

In 2023, he will be seen in Colors TV’s upcoming series Tere Ishq Mein Ghayal as Armaan.

Filmography

Films

Television

Web series

References

External links 

 
 

Indian male film actors
Indian male television actors
Male actors from Pune
21st-century Indian male actors
Male actors in Hindi cinema
Male actors in Hindi television
Male actors in Marathi cinema
1985 births
Living people
Indian male soap opera actors